A. L. Vijay, known professionally as Vijay, is an Indian film director who works in the Tamil film industry. An assistant director with Priyadarshan, he debuted as director with films such as Kireedam and the critically acclaimed Madrasapattinam. Vijay later directed films such as Deiva Thirumagal and Thaandavam, starring Vikram in both films.

Background and personal life
Vijay was born into a film family. His father, A. L. Azhagappan, is a noted film producer and a former President of the Tamil Nadu Producers Council. Azhagappan has also appeared as character artist in some films, including the film Eesan. Vijay's brother is the actor Udhaya (actual name: Senthil Kumar).

Vijay was briefly married to actress Amala Paul between 2014 and 2016-17. While Vijay belongs to a Tamil-speaking Hindu family, Amala comes from a Malayalam-speaking Christian family. They got engaged on 07 June 2014 at a Church in Aluva, Kerala, using a ring for the ceremony, and were married in a "traditional south Indian style wedding," presumably Hindu, on 12 June 2014 in Chennai. They separated in July 2016 and were granted a divorce by the courts in February 2017.

In July 2019, in a private family ceremony, Vijay married Dr.R.Aishwarya, a lady of his own community, in a match arranged by their families in the usual Indian way. On 30 May 2020, the couple were blessed with their first child, a baby boy.

Career
Prior to directing films, Vijay was a successful advertisement filmmaker with the Mumbai-based banner Venus Productions, completing more than 100 ad films. His State Bank of India commercial won CNBC's Best Corporate Advertisement Award in 2006. Vijay has claimed that "advertisements teach you how to translate a story idea onto screen with maximum impact in minimum time" and is influenced by the ad works of Suraaj, Prahlad Kakkar and Babu Shankar. In 2001, he began his career in feature films by joining Priyadarshan as an assistant director in his films.

He made his directorial debut with Kireedam in 2007, a remake of the 1989 film of the same name, directed by Sibi Malayil and written by A. K. Lohithadas. Vijay's version featured Ajith Kumar in the lead role with Trisha Krishnan, Rajkiran, Saranya and Vivek also as part of the cast, while the cinematographer was Tirru, the music was composed by G. V. Prakash Kumar and the film was edited by Anthony. Vijay revealed that he "reworked about 80 per cent" from the original version and his first choice of male lead role was Vijay, however his role was grabbed by Ajith for his career security. The film opened to positive reviews with a critic from Sify.com citing that Vijay had "a lot of guts and conviction to make a realistic film". The reviewer from The Hindu also praised the film labelling that "Vijay has neatly packaged a strong story line with a sensibly balanced mix of sentiment and action.", but claimed that "Vijay could have worked on the lead character more." The final scene in the film was changed after release from a sad to an upbeat ending after the producers felt that the original scene may keep audiences away. The film consequently went on to become a profitable venture at the box office. Vijay then returned to work as an assistant to Suraj in his action-masala Padikathavan, by helping with the dialogues and described his work in the project as "a pulsating experience".

Vijay's next remake of the Hindi film Khosla Ka Ghosla in Tamil, under his production house, and hence they collaborated to make Poi Solla Porom. The film was completed within 13 days, with a cast containing veteran actors such as Nassar and Nedumudi Venu as well as relative newcomers including Karthik Kumar and Piaa Bajpai. The film also became one of the first ventures in Tamil cinema to feature a promotional song, with Vijay maintaining that the song reflected the story of the film. The film won positive reviews from critics with The Hindu citing that "Vijay's dialogue, both humorous and thought-provoking, tickles the viewer almost throughout" and that "Vijay has understood the pulse of the audience even while sticking to his stand of providing standard fare".

Vijay revealed that Madrasapattinam was supposed to happen later in his career, but the intervention of producer Kalpathi S. Aghoram of AGS Entertainment realized the viability of the film earlier. Vijay had first explored the script in his college days and drew inspiration from an English professor, who used to talk to them about the freedom movement a lot. Vijay visualized the people, who lived in the pre-independence period of India and explored the concept of how it would have been, if an English girl fell in love with an Indian boy, laying the foundations for the script. The script took six months to write with the help of leading Tamil writer Prabanjan. He also visited independence veterans to understand the history of the city of Madras between 1945 and 1947. Arya was finalised to play the lead role and English Miss Teen World winner Amy Jackson was selected after Vijay found a picture of her through the internet. Despite being a period film, the film was finished in eight months and released in July 2010.

The production of the film, Deiva Thirumagal took five months from start to finish, however, Vijay claimed that the film had been in his plans for four years, but he waited for Vikram to give him dates. Amala Paul was selected after Vijay was pleased with her award-winning work in Mynaa. Sara had appeared in a commercial for Vijay when she was two, but he then lost touch with Sara's family, before he met them and cast Sara in Deiva Thirumagal, following a visit to Mumbai.

Vijay directed the Harris: On The Edge concerts by music composer Harris Jayaraj.

In 2013, he worked with Vijay alongside Amala Paul for the movie Thalaivaa. Despite winning good reviews, the film's delayed release in Tamil Nadu due to protests greatly affected the box office performance in Tamil Nadu, thus ending up as an average grosser.

In February 2016, he was named as a director of Prabhu Deva trilingual film Devi opposite Tamannaah which was made in Tamil, Telugu and Hindi. This marked his debut in Telugu and Hindi languages.

In 2021, he directed a biographical drama film Thalaivii based on the life of Indian actress-politician J. Jayalalithaa. The film starred Kangana Ranaut as the main protagonist ‘Jayalalithaa’ and Arvind Swami as M. G. Ramachandran. The bilingual film was shot in Tamil and Hindi simultaneously.

Filmmaking style
Vijay has described that he wants his audience "to immerse themselves" in his films, and hence uses scenes which reflect the local culture, explaining that his scenes should mirror society and "lend it an element of timelessness". He revealed that while constructing a film, he "first thinks of the plot, then the screenplay and then the characters", and tries to portray human values in his films.

He has expressed that he prefers "to mould actors" telling them to react and not act, drawing such inspiration from the work of Suraaj.

Furthermore, Vijay has showed interest in training people and mentoring their careers, citing that he likes to be the oldest member of his crew. His films have a "regular crew" which includes cinematographer Nirav Shah, music director G. V. Prakash Kumar (being his regular music composer until Devi), production designer Selva Kumar and editor Anthony.

Filmography

References

September 2011). "Harris on the Edge Concert" .TamilWire.com. Archived from the original on 29 September 2011
tamilwire.com/25802-harris-edge-concert.html

External links 

 

Tamil film directors
Living people
People from Tamil Nadu
Year of birth missing (living people)